Medetbek Temirbekovich Kerimkulov (born January 28, 1949) was the First Deputy Prime Minister of Kyrgyzstan between December 2005 and June 2006, when he became Minister for Industry, Trade, and Tourism. He resigned from this position in February 2007.

He was the acting Prime Minister of Kyrgyzstan for twenty days in 2005. He had previously been Mayor of Bishkek.

References

1949 births
Living people
Mayors of Bishkek
Prime Ministers of Kyrgyzstan